Birama Touré (born 6 June 1992) is a Malian professional footballer who plays as a defensive midfielder and captains Ligue 1 side Auxerre. He also plays for the Mali national football team.

Club career
Touré's career started in 2010 with his youth club Beauvais, he participated in 18 matches during 2010–11 and 2011–12 in Championnat National. In 2012, Touré joined Ligue 2 side Nantes. He made his debut for Nantes on 4 August 2012 against Nîmes, whilst scoring his first goal for them on 22 October versus Dijon. Touré played 58 times for Nantes in his first three seasons, including 26 apps in his debut season as the club won promotion to Ligue 1; he has also played 7 times for the club's reserve team. In November 2014, Touré signed for Ligue 2 team Brest on loan for the 2014–15 Ligue 2 season. He scored once in twenty-two league games before returning to Nantes.

On 1 July 2016, Touré completed a transfer to Belgian First Division A club Standard Liège and subsequently made his debut on 19 August in a league draw with Charleroi. In his second league appearance, versus Club Brugge, he scored his first Standard Liège goal. On 16 January 2017, Touré left to join Ligue 2 side Auxerre on loan.

International career
Touré has represented the Mali national team internationally.

Career statistics

Club
.

Honours
Nantes II
 Championnat de France Amateur 2: 2012–13 Group G

References

External links

1992 births
Living people
Malian footballers
Association football midfielders
Mali international footballers
Ligue 1 players
Ligue 2 players
Championnat National players
Championnat National 2 players
Belgian Pro League players
AS Beauvais Oise players
FC Nantes players
Stade Brestois 29 players
Standard Liège players
AJ Auxerre players
Malian expatriate footballers
Expatriate footballers in France
Expatriate footballers in Belgium
Malian expatriate sportspeople in France
Malian expatriate sportspeople in Belgium
People from Kayes
21st-century Malian people